Toby is an unincorporated community and coal town in Elk County, Pennsylvania, United States.

References

Coal towns in Pennsylvania
Unincorporated communities in Elk County, Pennsylvania
Unincorporated communities in Pennsylvania